The Dealey-class destroyer escorts were the first post-World War II escort ships built for the United States Navy.

Slightly faster and larger than the escort destroyers they succeeded, the Dealey class were fitted with twin-mounted  guns, anti-submarine (ASW) rockets, a depth charge rack and six depth charge launchers. There were later modernizations that removed the ASW rockets and the depth charges in favor of nuclear-capable anti-submarine rocket launchers and torpedo mounts which fired lighter homing torpedoes. A large SQS 23 sonar was refitted in a bow sonar dome and most of the class were also fitted with a hangar and landing pad for DASH drone helicopters to deliver MK 44 and Mk 46 torpedoes. The drone helicopters proved very unreliable and their failure contributed to the relatively short life of the class.

Development and design
The existing submarine chasers were considered too small to carry the required anti-submarine weapons and sensors, and too slow to catch modern submarines, with a ship the size of existing destroyer escorts required. The ships would need to be cheap and quick to build, as large numbers would be required in the event of a war. An ahead-throwing anti-submarine weapon, at first planned to be the Mark 17, a large, trainable Hedgehog anti-submarine spigot mortar, would be fitted.

Displacement was  light and  full load. 2 Foster-Wheeler boilers fed steam to a geared steam turbine, which drove a single propeller shaft. A single-shaft machinery layout was chosen to ease mass production, avoiding potential bottlenecks in gear-cutting which had delayed production of wartime destroyer escorts.

As built, the ships had a gun armament of two twin 3-inch (76 mm)/50 calibre guns, mounted fore and aft. These were open, manually trained dual-purpose mounts which could be used against both surface and anti-aircraft targets.  The Mark 17 Hedgehog was cancelled before the ships were built, so in its place two British Squid anti-submarine mortars were fitted ahead of the ship's bridge in Dealey, with a RUR-4 Weapon Alpha anti-submarine rocket launcher fitted in the remaining ships of the class. Launchers for anti-submarine torpedoes were fitted, and depth charge throwers were fitted on the ships' fantail. Sensors included the SPS-6 air-search radar and the SQS-4 low-frequency sonar.

The prototype ship, Dealey, was built under the Fiscal year (FY) 1952 shipbuilding program, with two ordered in both the FY 1953 and 1954 programs and eight in the 1955 program. Production was stopped at 13 because the Dealey class was considered too expensive at $12 million for mass production. This resulted in the smaller, diesel-powered  being built. The Dealey design formed the basis for the Norwegian  and Portuguese s.

Modifications
All of the class except Dealey, Cromwell and Courtney were upgraded in the 1960s by adding facilities for the DASH drone helicopter, with a hangar and helicopter deck replacing the aft 3-inch gun mount and the longer-ranged SQS-23 sonar replaced the SQS-4. The three unmodified ships were fitted with a Variable Depth Sonar (VDS). All ships had their Squid or Weapon Alpha launchers removed late in their US Navy career, while Mark 32 torpedo tubes for Mark 44 or Mark 46 anti-submarine torpedoes were fitted.

Ships

Notes

Citations

References

External links

 Dealey-class ocean escorts at Destroyer History Foundation

 
Cold War frigates and destroyer escorts of the United States